Richard Krawczyk (born 24 May 1947 in Aix-Noulette) is a French retired professional football midfielder.

Krawczyk became the youngest goalscorer in Ligue 1 history in September 1963 by helping Lens beat Angers 2-1.

Personal life
Krawczyk was born in France and is of Polish descent.

References

External links
Profile on French federation official site
Profile
Profile - FC Metz

1947 births
Living people
French footballers
France international footballers
French people of Polish descent
Association football midfielders
RC Lens players
FC Metz players
Stade de Reims players
Ligue 1 players
Ligue 2 players
US Nœux-les-Mines players